John Trumbull Van Alen (d. August 27, 1857) was an American merchant and diplomat who served as the American Chargé d'affaires to Ecuador from June 5, 1849 to August 1850.

Biography
Colonel Van Alen, a native of New York who worked as a merchant, was appointed by President Zachary Taylor to succeed fellow New Yorker, Van Brugh Livingston, as the Chargé d'Affaires to Ecuador in Quito, in a recess appointment, on June 5, 1849.  Van Alen had helped Taylor get elected to the presidency and "enjoyed a greater degree of the old veteran's confidence and affection than almost any other person not of his immediate kindred."

He presented his credentials on November 19, 1849, Van Alen, who was known as "callow and impulsive," reportedly "lacked experience in diplomacy and knowledge of Ecuadorian politics," and "decided that Ecuador could be rescued from ruin only by General Flores," the former president of Ecuador.  He wrote to Washington advising them that Flores was popular and had been "unjustly ousted by a small clique of opportunists."  While in Ecuador, he was able to negotiate a treaty regarding the brig Morris which was captured and sold by the authorities of Colombia.

Van Alen's last dispatch at his post was on July 18, 1850, before he resigned in October 1850 due to illness.  Van Alen was recommissioned on August 10, 1850, after confirmation, but did not serve under his second appointment.  Eventually he was succeeded by Courtland Cusing of Indiana who was commissioned on September 28, 1850.

After his retirement from the diplomatic services, he spent several years abroad, mostly in England.

Upon his return to the United States, he purchased a country estate near Poughkeepsie, New York, where he died on August 27, 1857.

See also
List of ambassadors of the United States to Ecuador

References

External links
John Trumbull Van Alen (?–1857) at the Office of the Historian, Bureau of Public Affairs United States Department of State

Year of birth unknown
1857 deaths
American people of Dutch descent
Ambassadors of the United States to Ecuador
19th-century American diplomats